Luciano Cozzi (9 September 1909 – 18 September 1996) was an Italian diver. He competed in the men's 3 metre springboard event at the 1928 Summer Olympics.

References

1909 births
1996 deaths
Italian male divers
Olympic divers of Italy
Divers at the 1928 Summer Olympics
Divers from Milan